Piranha is a 1978 American comedy horror film directed and co-edited by Joe Dante from a screenplay by John Sayles, based on a story by Richard Robinson and Sayles. The film stars Bradford Dillman, Heather Menzies, Kevin McCarthy, Keenan Wynn, Barbara Steele and Dick Miller. It tells the story of a river being infested by lethal, genetically altered piranha, threatening the lives of the local inhabitants and the visitors to a nearby summer resort.

Executive produced by Roger Corman, Piranha is  the first installment in a series of low-budget B movies inspired by the film Jaws (1975), which had been a major success for Universal Pictures and director Steven Spielberg. Initially, Universal had considered obtaining an injunction to prevent Piranha being released, particularly as they had released Jaws 2 the same summer, but the lawsuit was dropped after Spielberg himself gave the film a positive comment in advance. Released on August 3, 1978, the film was a commercial success and later became a cult film. Piranha was followed by a sequel, Piranha II: The Spawning (1982), and two remakes, one in 1995 and another in 2010, which spawned its own sequel in 2012.

Plot

Two teenagers find an abandoned military compound and skinny dip in a holding pool, but are attacked and killed by an unseen force.

Sometime later, determined yet absent-minded skiptracer Maggie McKeown is dispatched to find the missing teenagers near Lost River Lake and hires surly backwoods drunkard, Paul Grogan, to guide her. They discover the compound and find bizarre jarred specimens and evidence of an occupant inside. Locating a drainage switch for the nearby pool, McKeown empties it to search the bottom, but a haggard man enters and tries to stop her until Grogan subdues him. The pair find a skeleton in the pool's filtration trap and learn it was filled with saltwater. The man awakens and steals their jeep, but crashes due to being disoriented and is taken to Grogan's home. The next day, as the three travel downriver, the stranger tells the pair the pool was filled with a school of piranha and McKeown released them into the river. She and Grogan are skeptical until they come across the corpse of Grogan's friend Jack.

The stranger reveals himself as Dr. Robert Hoak, lead scientist of a defunct Vietnam War project called Operation: Razorteeth, which involved genetically-engineering a ravenous and prodigious strain of piranha that could endure the North Vietnamese rivers' cold waters and inhibit Viet Cong movement. The project was canceled after the war ended, but the mutant specimens survived and Hoak tended to them to salvage his work. Grogan realizes that if the local dam is opened, the piranha will gain access to the Lost River resort and the nearby summer camp. On their way, the trio rescue a boy whose father was killed  by the piranha, but Hoak is killed by the mutants before he can reveal how to kill them and the survivors narrowly make it to shore. Grogan successfully stops the dam attendant from opening the spillway before calling the military.

A military team led by Colonel Waxman and former Razorteeth scientist Dr. Mengers spread poison upstream, ignoring protests that the piranha survived the first attempt. When Grogan discovers a tributary that bypasses the dam, Waxman and Mengers quarantine him and McKeown to prevent them from alerting the media. The pair escape, but Waxman alerts law enforcement to capture them while the piranha attack the summer camp, injuring and killing many children and a camp counselor.

Waxman and Mengers arrive at the water park to intercept Grogan and McKeown, but the piranha attack and kill many vacationers and Waxman. Intending to prevent the piranha from reaching the ocean and spreading around the world, Grogan and Maggie commandeer a speedboat and rush to a shuttered smelting plant in the hopes that they can use its industrial waste to kill the mutants. They arrive at the plant before the piranha, but the control office is submerged, forcing Grogan to go underwater with a safety line. Despite being attacked by the piranha, he opens the valves and McKeown pulls him to safety. The pair return to the water park, where Grogan enters a catatonic state. During a televised interview, Mengers spins an altered version of events and downplays the piranha's existence.

Cast

The screenwriter John Sayles appears in a cameo as a sentry.

Production

Release

Theatrical
The film was released theatrically in the United States by New World Pictures in August 1978. Given the proximity to Jaws 2, Universal Pictures had considered an injunction, but Spielberg convinced them otherwise.

Home media
In 2004, New Concorde Home Entertainment released the film on special edition DVD.

In 2010, as a tie-in to the release of the remake, Shout! Factory re-released Piranha on DVD and Blu-ray.

On March 13, 2015, the film screened in a R-rated Ultimate Edition presented by Fangoria magazine and special guests Rebekah McKendry, curator Mike Williamson and actress Belinda Balaski.

Reception

Critical response
The film received mixed reviews at the time of its release. Roger Ebert mocked the "really bad special effects" and the "odd compulsion" of the characters "to jump into the water the very moment they discover it is infested by piranhas". Variety wrote that the film was "not without its exciting moments" and noted that the in-jokes for film buffs added "another dimension to a routine potboiler". Gene Siskel of the Chicago Tribune gave the film one-half star out of four, particularly objecting to the use of women and children as frequent targets of the attacks. Jill Forbes of The Monthly Film Bulletin called it "a quickie from the Corman company that can't decide whether to plump for horror, science fiction or social comedy, and plays safe with something for everyone", and found it "a lot of fun". Marjorie Bilbow of Screen International wrote that the film "works as spirited scream and giggle nonsense because there is always something happening and Joe Dante directs with a slyly tongue-in-cheek awareness of the existence of big brother Jaws".

The film later acquired a cult status. It currently has a 70% on Rotten Tomatoes based on 27 reviews, with an average rating of 6.42 out of 10. The site's critics consensus reads, "Performed with a wink and directed with wry self-awareness, Piranha is an unabashed B-movie with satirical bite."

Steven Spielberg called the film "the best of the Jaws ripoffs".

Remakes

Piranha was first remade in 1995; this version was also produced by Roger Corman and originally debuted on Showtime. It used footage from the original film for certain sequences.

Another remake of the 1978 film is directed by Alexandre Aja, who again works with filmmaking partner Grégory Levasseur. The two have worked on other genre films as well, including the 2006 remake, The Hills Have Eyes. Distributor Dimension Films' Bob Weinstein told Variety, "We will maintain the fun and thrilling aspects of the original film, but look forward to upping the ante with a modern-day twist." Piranha 3D was theatrically released in the United States on August 20, 2010, and is in 3D.

Dimension had been developing the remake of the 1978 Joe Dante film Piranha for over a year. It intended to have Chuck Russell, who previously reworked the 1988 version of The Blob, direct the film before taking on Alexandre Aja. Aja intended to rewrite a previous script from Josh Stolberg and Pete Goldfinger. Aja explained, "My goal is not to remake Piranha, but to create a completely new adventure paying homage to all the creature films [...] I am very proud to follow the path of Joe Dante and James Cameron, and look forward to working with Greg Levasseur to write, produce, and direct such a fun and gory thrill ride." The film's cast includes Elisabeth Shue, Christopher Lloyd, Richard Dreyfuss, Adam Scott and Jerry O'Connell.

See also
 Killer Fish

References

External links

 
 
 
 
Director Joe Dante discusses Piranha in this KVUE interview from the Texas Archive of the Moving Image

1978 films
1978 independent films
1978 horror films
American horror films
American independent films
American natural horror films
1970s English-language films
Films about piranhas
Films directed by Joe Dante
Films produced by Roger Corman
Films scored by Pino Donaggio
New World Pictures films
Films with screenplays by John Sayles
Films about summer camps
United Artists films
1970s American films